The Liyu Lake or Carp Lake is a lake in Chinan Village, Shoufeng Township, Hualien County, Taiwan.

Name
Liyu means carp in English where by the name, the lake has a lot of carps. The name itself originated from the Liyu Mountain beside the lake.

Geography
The lake is about 1.6 km in length and 930 meters in width, making it the largest inland lake in Hualien County with a total area of 104 hectares. The lake is located at the foot of Mount Liyu.

Features
After the development of the lake into a scenic spot, the lake becomes the site of various recreational activities, such as light boat sailing, water sports, etc. It has single lane bicycle path around 5 km encircling the lake and footpaths for strolling along the shore. The Chinan National Forest Recreation Area and Mukumugi surrounding the lake displays the old logging trains and the logging displays and aboriginal culture respectively. Every year in April, thousand of fireflies flash above the lake.

Transportation
The lake is accessible by bus towards Shoufeng from Hualien Station of Taiwan Railways.

References

Lakes of Taiwan
Landforms of Hualien County
Tourist attractions in Hualien County